Murrayville is an unincorporated community in Hall County, Georgia, United States. Murrayville has a post office with ZIP code 30564.

The community was named after Patrick J. Murray, a local merchant.

References

Unincorporated communities in Hall County, Georgia
Unincorporated communities in Georgia (U.S. state)